George Dollinger Pyper (November 21, 1860 – January 17, 1943) was the fifth general superintendent of the Sunday School of the Church of Jesus Christ of Latter-day Saints (LDS Church), a member and manager of the Mormon Tabernacle Choir, and the editor of a number of Latter Day Saint periodicals.

Pyper was born in Salt Lake City, Utah Territory. In 1896 and 1897, he was a missionary for the LDS Church in the Eastern States Mission of the church.

From 1898 to 1929, Pyper was the manager of the Salt Lake Theatre. (The theatre was torn down in 1929.) As theatre manager, Pyper kept an extensive collection of photographs of performers; the collection is currently held by the J. Willard Marriott Library at the University of Utah.

A talented singer, Pyper was the leading tenor in the Salt Lake Opera Company for many years. He was a member of and the manager of the Mormon Tabernacle Choir. In 1911, Pyper managed a 6000-mile American tour for the choir, wherein they performed in Madison Square Gardens and at the White House for U.S. President William Howard Taft. In 1929, Pyper became the chair of the LDS Church's Pageant Committee, which produced the performance The Message for the Ages as a celebration of the church's centennial. At the age of 80, Pyper was a technical advisor to the producers of the 1940 Hollywood film Brigham Young; Pyper had known Young prior to his death in 1877.

In 1918, Pyper was asked by church Apostle and general Sunday School superintendent David O. McKay to be his second assistant. Pyper served in this capacity until 1934, when McKay was released and Pyper was called as the fifth general superintendent of the Deseret Sunday School Union. Pyper was the first general superintendent of the LDS Sunday School who was not also an apostle of the church. Pyper's assistants were Milton Bennion and George R. Hill, both of whom went on to serve as general Sunday School superintendents.

In 1890 and 1891, Pyper was an associate editor of The Contributor, a periodical targeted at Latter-day Saint adolescents. Beginning in 1910, Pyper became the editor of The Juvenile Instructor, the LDS Church Sunday School's official periodical. When the Juvenile Instructor folded and was replaced by The Instructor, Pyper became the first editor of the new publication, a position he held until his death.

Pyper is the author of the 1930 book Stories of the Latter-day Saint Hymns, their Authors, and Composers. He composed the music to "Does the Journey Seem Long?", a hymn written by Joseph Fielding Smith which is included in the 1985 English-language LDS Church hymnal as hymn #127.

Pyper was married to Emmaretta Smith Whitney and was the father of two children.

Notes

References
 Arnold K. Garr, Donald Q. Cannon & Richard O. Cowan (eds.) (2000).  Encyclopedia of Latter-day Saint History (Salt Lake City, Utah: Deseret Book)

External links
 George D. Pyper Collection at University of Utah Digital Library, Marriott Library Special Collections*George D. Pyper Photograph Collection : University of Utah

1860 births
1943 deaths
19th-century Mormon missionaries
American Latter Day Saint hymnwriters
American Latter Day Saint writers
American Mormon missionaries in the United States
American leaders of the Church of Jesus Christ of Latter-day Saints
American tenors
Counselors in the General Presidency of the Sunday School (LDS Church)
Editors of Latter Day Saint publications
General Presidents of the Sunday School (LDS Church)
Latter Day Saints from Utah
Musicians from Salt Lake City
People of Utah Territory
Tabernacle Choir members